Amnesia is the sixth studio album by Richard Thompson, recorded and released in 1988.

After the lackluster sales of Across a Crowded Room (1985) and Daring Adventures (1986), Polydor declined their option to renew their contract with Thompson. Thompson's then manager Gary Stamler negotiated a deal with Capitol Records and Thompson cut his first album for his new label in 1988.

This was a good time for Thompson to be at Capitol: at the time the label was managed by Hale Milgrim who was already a fan of Thompson and his work. Thus Capitol invested more money and effort into promoting Thompson than had been the case in the past and with other labels.

Mitchell Froom was retained as producer, and the album was again recorded in Los Angeles with American session musicians providing most of the backing. Thompson still used British players to lend specifically British touches to some songs. In particular long-time collaborators John Kirkpatrick, Aly Bain and Philip Pickett are used, and members of the Fairey Engineering Band provide a brass backing to "I Still Dream" that owes more to The Salvation Army than it does to Memphis or any other American centre of music.

Reception 

The album was well-received by the music press, and sales, whilst not stellar, were boosted by Capitol's commitment to promoting artist and album.

Track listing
All songs written by Richard Thompson

"Turning of the Tide" 2:55
"Gypsy Love Songs" 6:14
"Reckless Kind" 4:23
"Jerusalem on the Jukebox" 4:08
"I Still Dream" 5:09
"Don't Tempt Me" 3:35
"Yankee, Go Home" 3:05
"Can't Win" 5:28
"Waltzing's for Dreamers" 4:06
"Pharaoh" 4:24

Personnel

Musicians 

Richard Thompson - guitar, vocals, mandolin, hammer dulcimer
Mitchell Froom - portative organ, regal, Chamberlin, stereophonic Optigan, electric harp, organ, producer
Jerry Scheff - bass guitar on 1, 2, 4, 5, 7, & 10
Tony Levin - bass guitar, stick on 3, 6, & 8
Mickey Curry - drums on 2, 3, 6, 7, 8
Jim Keltner - drums on 1, 4, 5, 10
Alex Acuña - percussion
Christine Collister - backing vocals
Clive Gregson - backing vocals
John Kirkpatrick - accordion, anglo-concertina, bass vocals
Philip Pickett - shawm, recorder, curtal, Peking that, bass racket
Aly Bain - fiddle on 9
Brian Taylor - cornet on 5 (Fairey Band)
Tony Goddard - cornet on 5 (Fairey Band)
David Horn - tenor horn on 5 (Fairey Band)
Ian Peters - euphonium on 5 (Fairey Band)
Fred Tackett - acoustic guitar on 8
Frances Kelly - baroque harp
Danny Thompson - double bass on 9
Alistair Anderson - Northumbrian pipes

Technical
Tchad Blake – recordist
Mike Kloster – 2nd engineer
Ted Patterson – 2nd engineer
Bob Ludwig – mastering
Hugh Brown – cover art and photography

References

External links 
 Richard Thompson – Amnesia – Classic Music Review at altrockchick.com

1988 albums
Richard Thompson (musician) albums
Albums produced by Mitchell Froom
Capitol Records albums